Paul Lisicky (born July 9, 1959) is an American novelist and memoirist. He is an associate professor in the MFA Program at Rutgers University-Camden, and the author of several books.

Early life
Paul Lisicky was born on July 9, 1959. He grew up in Cherry Hill, New Jersey. He graduated from Rutgers University-New Brunswick, earned an MA from Rutgers University-Camden and an MFA from the Iowa Writers' Workshop.

Career
Lisicky taught in the creative writing programs at Cornell University, New York University, Rutgers University-Newark, Sarah Lawrence College, the University of North Carolina Wilmington, and elsewhere. He is now an associate professor in the MFA Program at Rutgers University-Camden.

Lisicky is the author of six books: Lawnboy, Famous Builder, The Burning House, Unbuilt Projects, The Narrow Door, and Later: My Life at the Edge of the World.

His work has appeared in The Atlantic, Conjunctions, Ecotone, Fence, The New York Times, The Offing, Ploughshares, Tin House, and in many other magazines and anthologies. His awards include fellowships from the Guggenheim Foundation, the National Endowment for the Arts, the James Michener/Copernicus Society, the Corporation of Yaddo, and the Fine Arts Work Center in Provincetown, where he was twice a Fellow. He is the editor of StoryQuarterly and serves on the Writing Committee of the Fine Arts Work Center in Provincetown.

In 2021, Paul Lisicky appeared on Storybound (podcast) reading an excerpt from Later : my life at the edge of the world, with music sampled from Jordan Warmack.

Personal life
Lisicky lives in Brooklyn, New York City. From 1995 until 2011, his partner was the writer Mark Doty. They were married in 2008 and divorced in 2013.

See also
 Literary analysis
 LGBT culture in New York City
 List of LGBT people from New York City

References

External links
Graywolf Press page for Paul Lisicky
Writers on the Edge: Paul Lisicky
Review of Lawnboy from the Austin Chronicle
Interview with Windy City Times
Official Site
Blog
 Radio Interview with Paul Lisicky on "Read First, Ask Later" (Ep. 21)

1959 births
Living people
21st-century American novelists
21st-century American memoirists
American male novelists
American gay writers
People from Cherry Hill, New Jersey
Writers from New York City
Rutgers University alumni
Sarah Lawrence College faculty
University of Iowa alumni
Iowa Writers' Workshop alumni
Place of birth missing (living people)
American LGBT novelists
21st-century American male writers
Novelists from New York (state)
American male non-fiction writers